is a video game compilation released in July 2005 by Namco in Japan only to celebrate the company's 50th anniversary. The compilation includes five PlayStation video games (Ace Combat 2, Klonoa: Door to Phantomile, Mr. Driller, Ridge Racer and Tekken) with analog controller support.

Development and release
NamCollection was released by Namco exclusively in Japan on July 21, 2005 for the PlayStation 2 to coincide with the company's 50th anniversary. The game was publicly announced by Japanese publication Famitsu on March 24, reported to be around 80% complete by that time. Originally slated for release on June 2, it was later delayed to July 31 of that year for unknown reasons.

Notes

References

External links
NamCollection site 

2005 video games
Japan-exclusive video games
Namco games
PlayStation 2 games
PlayStation 2-only games
Bandai Namco video game compilations
Video games developed in Japan